Helen Kevric (born 21 March 2008) is a German artistic gymnast.  She is the 2022 European Youth Olympic Festival and the 2022 European junior all-around champion.

Early life 
Kevric was born in 2008. She is the daughter of Bosnian former professional footballer Adnan Kevrić. She currently trains at MTV Stuttgart.

Gymnastics career

Junior

2020–21 
In 2020 Kevric competed at the Pre-Olympic Youth Cup where she placed first in the espoir division.  She next competed at the German National Championships where she placed first in the junior-2008 division.  Additionally she placed first on all four apparatuses.

At the 2021 German National Championships Kevric repeated her results from the year prior, winning the all-around and all four apparatuses titles in the junior-2008 division.  Kevric next competed at the Swiss Cup Juniors where she placed first in the all-around and helped the German team place first.  She ended the year winning gold at the Tournoi International.  Additionally she helped Germany place second as a team and won three additional apparatus medals.

2022
Kevric competed at the DTB Pokal Team Challenge where she recorded the highest all-around score.  She helped Germany place fourth as a team and individually she won silver on uneven bars behind Miella Brown of Australia.  She next competed at the City of Jesolo Trophy where she placed seventh in the all-around but won gold on uneven bars and bronze on floor exercise.  At the German National Championships Kevric won the all-around in the junior-2008 division for the third consecutive year.  She next competed at the European Youth Olympic Festival where she helped Germany win silver behind Romania.  Individually she won gold in the all-around and on vault and won silver on uneven bars and floor exercise.  Additionally she competed in the mixed pairs competition alongside Jukka Nissinen.  They won silver behind the Italian pair of Riccardo Villa and Arianna Grillo.

At the 2022 European Championships in Munich, Kevric became the European junior all-around champion, and helped the German junior team win the bronze medal behind Italy and Romania. She also won the silver medal on the uneven bars.

Competitive history

References

External links 
 

2008 births
Living people
German female artistic gymnasts
People from Ostfildern
Sportspeople from Stuttgart (region)
21st-century German women
European champions in gymnastics
German people of Bosnia and Herzegovina descent